Smile Please is an Indian Marathi language drama film, directed by Vikram Phadnis. The film follows the struggle of Nandini Joshi, (played by Mukta Barve) a photographer, who is diagonesed with an early-onset dementia, to find sense of purpose and dignity.

The film was released on 19 July 2019. Hrithik Roshan gave muhurat's first clap for the film, whereas Riteish Deshmukh launched the first poster of the film and Karan Johar unveiled the first teaser. Shahrukh Khan launched trailer of Smile Please.

Plot 
Nandini is a young woman who is an acclaimed well-known photographer. But she is diagnosed with dementia, which is in early stages. She meets Viraj who becomes her friend and gives her hope. The film revolves about how he helps her fight the newly discovered struggle in her life.

Cast
 Mukta Barve as Nandini
 Lalit Prabhakar as Viraj 
 Prasad Oak as Shishir Sarang, Nandini's ex husband , Nupur's father 
 Satish Alekar as Appa, Nandini's father 
 Aditi Govitrikar  as Anju, Nandini's psychologist 
 Trupti Khamkar as Jyoti 
 Vedashree Mahajan as Nupur‘Napa’, Nandini and Shishir's daughter 
 Bijay Anand as Jatin , Nandini's boss
 Mayuresh Wadkar

Release
The official teaser of the film was unveiled on 11 June 2019 by Karan Johar and trailer was launched on 26 June 2019 by Shah Rukh Khan. The film was released on 19 July 2019.

Critical response
Devesh Sharma reviewing for Filmfare rates the film with 3.5/5 stars. He praised performance of Barve and supporting cast. He wrote, "Mukta Barve makes you experience all the stages through her heartfelt performance." He recommended watching the film for its positive message, and concluded, “Watch this well-meaning film for its positive message about a disease which has been affecting around four million people in our country alone." Mihir Bhanage of The Times of India gave the film three stars out of five, and praised the performances of Mukta Barve, Prasad, Satish Alekar and felt that a 'crisper editing' would have been better for film. Concluding, he wrote "Smile Please has its highs and lows, the latter overshadowing the former at times, but as a complete film, this one is definitely better than Phadnis’ first. And true to its title, the climax brings a smile to your face."

Barve received the Filmfare Marathi Awards 2020 in Best Actress category for the film and she dedicated the award to Phadnis' mother; on whose life the film is based. She had received award in same category for the film Hrudayantar (2017), which was also directed by Phadnis.

Soundtrack

The soundtrack is composed by music composer duo Rohan-Rohan and lyrics are by Manndar Cholkar. Song "Shwaas De" sung by Singer Rohan Pradhan. "Chal Pudhe Chal Tu" (Anthem Song) is sung by Avadhoot Gupte, Mugdha Karhade, Bela Shende, Rohan Pradhan, Sachin Pilgaonkar and Gwen Dias. Song "Anolkhi" is sung by Sunidhi Chauhan.

References

External links
 

2010s Marathi-language films
2019 films
Films about memory
Films scored by Rohan-Rohan